Terence Ronald Fulton (17 April 1930 – 15 July 2022) was an Australian rules footballer in the Victorian Football League (VFL). A speedy wingman, he played in Geelong's 1951 and 1952 VFL premierships.

References

External links

1930 births
2022 deaths
Geelong Football Club players
Geelong Football Club Premiership players
Geelong West Football Club players
East Geelong Football Club players
Australian rules footballers from Victoria (Australia)
Two-time VFL/AFL Premiership players